Togmidyn Dorjkhand (Mongolian: Тогмидын Доржханд, pronounced Tog-myd-yn Dor-zhi-hand) is a Mongolian politician, serving as a member of the parliament (MP) and Leader of the Hun Party. He has been serving in the parliament since 2020; originally elected from the Right Person Electorate Coalition, he is the only MP from his party.

His career in the 2000s is characterised by his role in the Ministry of Treasury as a financial specialist. After graduating from the National University of Mongolia with a Bachelor's degree in Finance in 1999, he joined the Ministry of Treasury, first as Strategy and Management Specialist in the Procurement Department in 2001, then as Budget Policy Specialist directly under the Minister. In 2003, he went to Japan to obtain a Master's degree in State Economic Policy in Hitotsubashi University in Tokyo while interning at Japan's finance ministry. 

In the early 2010s, he started looking abroad for economic development examples by studying at Harvard University and the University of Oxford and working with the Asian Development Bank and the International Monetary Fund on various projects. In 2015, he entered the politics by joining the Hun Party (then National Labour Party) on a platform for fighting corruption, efficiency in the public sector, quality health care, education and effective social policies. 

The Hun Party has been steadily gaining ground in the recent years, and it is currently the only party with a seat in the State Great Khural and Municipal Councils except the two mainstream parties. When the Democratic Party was divided into anti and pro-Battulga factions in 2021, many dissatisfied voters and non-partisan affiliates turned to the Hun Party, which is illustrated by its remarkable performance in the 2021 presidential election. In the presidential election, it took the second place by a vote share of around 25%, thereby outrunning the Democratic Party, which has been the main opposition to the Mongolian People's Party for over 30 years, signalling a seismic shift in the country's political landscape.

Dorjkhand is seen as an outsider to the Mongolian politics, which has been losing trust in the public due to the factionalism, corruption and opportunism within the mainstream political parties. In 2022, the Constitutional Court overturned its previous decision banning proportional voting system, and if the parliament moves forward with the proposed electoral law reforms, including semi-proportional voting and increased parliamentary seats, he and his party are expected to be significant players in the country's politics in the next few years.

References 

1977 births
Living people